The 2018 Pro14 Grand Final was the final match of the 2017–18 Pro14 season. The 2017–18 season is the fourth with Guinness as the title sponsor, the ninth with a Grand Final and the first season with 14 teams, following the admission of two South African teams. The final was played at the Aviva Stadium in Dublin and saw Leinster defeat the Scarlets 40–32.

Route to the final

Final Match

References

2017
2017–18 Pro14
Pro14 Grand Final
Leinster Rugby matches
Scarlets matches
2017–18 in Irish rugby union
2017–18 in Welsh rugby union